hr2-kultur is a German, public radio station owned and operated by the Hessischer Rundfunk (HR).

References

Radio stations in Germany
Radio stations established in 1950
1950 establishments in West Germany
Mass media in Frankfurt
Hessischer Rundfunk